The Rocking-Horse Winner is a short story by D. H. Lawrence. It may also refer to:

The Rocking Horse Winner (film), a 1950 full-length film adaptation of the story
The Rocking Horse Winner (1977 film), a 1977 30-minute TV movie adaptation of the story
The Rocking Horse Winner (1997 film), a 1997 American 23-minute short film adaptation of the story
The Rocking Horse Winner (band), an American indie rock band (1999–2003)